Mount Dalton is a peak  high, in East Antarctica.

It was sketched and photographed by Phillip Law on February 20, 1959, during the Australian National Antarctic Research Expeditions (ANARE) (Magga Dan) expedition, and was named by the Antarctic Names Committee of Australia for R.F.M. Dalton, Technical Officer (aircraft) of the Antarctic Division and second-in-charge of this expedition.

References 

Mountains of Oates Land